The 1991–92 Maltese Premier League was the 12th season of the Maltese Premier League, and the 77th season of top-tier football in Malta. It was contested by 10 teams, and Valletta F.C. won the championship.

League standings

Relegation tie-breaker
With both St. Andrews and Zurrieq level on 9 points, a play-off match was conducted to determine 9th place and the relegation.

Results

References
Malta - List of final tables (RSSSF)

Maltese Premier League seasons
Malta
1991–92 in Maltese football